The suspicious lizardfish (Saurida suspicio) is a species of lizardfish that lives mainly in the Caribbean.

Information
The Suspicious lizardfish is known to be found in a marine environment within a demersal range.  This species is native to a tropical climate. The average length of the Suspicious lizardfish as an unsexed male is about nine centimeters or about 3.5 inches. They are recorded to occupy the areas of Western Atlantic, the Bahamas, Leeward Islands, the western Caribbean, and the Antilles. This species lives in coral reefs and sandy bottoms. This species of fish cannot be kept in an aquarium and is not used for commerce. The Suspicious lizardfish does not pose as a threat to humans.

References

Notes
 

suspicious lizardfish
Fish of the Caribbean
suspicious lizardfish